
Year 421 (CDXXI) was a common year starting on Saturday (link will display the full calendar) of the Julian calendar. At the time, it was known as the Year of the Consulship of Agricola and Eustathius (or, less frequently, year 1174 Ab urbe condita). The denomination 421 for this year has been used since the early medieval period, when the Anno Domini calendar era became the prevalent method in Europe for naming years.

Events 
 By place 

 Roman Empire 
 February 8 – Constantius III is appointed co-emperor (Augustus) with his ineffectual brother-in-law, Honorius, and becomes the real ruler of the Western Roman Empire.
 March 25 – Venice is founded at twelve o'clock noon (according to legend) with the dedication of the first church, San Giacomo, at the islet of Rialto (Italy).  
 June 7 – Emperor Theodosius II marries Aelia Eudocia, a woman of Greek origin. The wedding is celebrated at Constantinople with chariot racing in the Hippodrome.
 September 2 – Constantius III dies suddenly of an illness; his wife Galla Placidia becomes, for the second time, a widow. She departs with her children Grata Honoria and Valentinian to the court of Constantinople.

 Europe 
 Rugila, chieftain of the Huns, attacks the dioceses of Dacia and Thrace (Balkans). Theodosius II allows Pannonian Ostrogoths to settle in Thrace, to defend the Danube frontier.
 The Franks conquer new territories in their kingdom and sack the old Roman capital Augusta Treverorum (modern Trier).

 Persia 
 Roman–Sassanid War: Theodosius II starts a war against the Sassanids, sending an expeditionary force under command of Ardaburius, and invades Mesopotamia. 
 Autumn – Ardaburius devastates Arzanene (Armenia) and forces the Persians to retreat to Nisibis (Syria). King Bahram V allies himself with the Lakhmid Arabs of Hirah.

Births

Deaths 
 September 2 – Constantius III, emperor of the Western Roman Empire
 Jin Gongdi, last emperor of the Jin Dynasty (b. 386)
 Li Xun, ruler of the Chinese state Western Liang
 Mary of Egypt, patron saint (approximate date)
 Ravina I, rabbi (teacher) and Jewish  Talmudist

References